Yaushev are a Volga Tatar noble family.

Early history

The family is a branch of the Ar begs aristocratic clan and descents from Yaush, a nobleman mentioned in chronicles related to the Siege of Kazan in 1552. Descendants of Yaush were Serving Tatars in Russia and were granted Russian noble title and land by Ivan the Terrible. Under Peter the Great the Yaushev family was stripped of nobility for the refusal to convert from Islam to the Russian Orthodox Church. In the subsequent decades, parts of the family restored their title.

Merchant family

A branch of the larger Yaushev clan became a prominent merchant family in the 19th and early 20th century by trading between Russia and Central Asia. The merchant dynasty was founded in Troitsk in the early 19th century by Gaisa Yaushev (1790–1870). It was later represented by his son Akhmedzhan Yaushev (1818–1875) and gained the largest influence under his grandsons Abdulvali Yaushev (1840–1906) and Mullagali Yaushev (1864–1927). The family firm was known as the Trading House of the Yaushev Brothers in the early 20th century.

The Yaushev merchant family owned stores and trading arcades ("passages") in the Southern Ural (Troitsk, Chelyabinsk, Kustanay) and Central Asia (Tashkent), as well as cotton, tea, soap and leather manufactures in what now are Russia and Uzbekistan.

The Yaushevs were sponsors and active members of the liberal Muslim movement in Russia, Jadidism. They financed several Islamic modernist schools and mosques, such as the White Mosque in Kustanay.

After the October Revolution, the property of the Yaushev merchant family was nationalized by the bolsheviks. The family went into exile to Japan, China, the United States and Western Europe. Some members of the family later returned to Soviet Russia.

Architecture related to the Yaushev merchant family

Muslim cleric family

A different branch of the Yaushev family became religious leaders in what is now northern Kazakhstan in the second half of the 19th century and early 20th century. Gabdelbari Yaushev (1814—1894) and his son Gabdelvagap Yaushev (1859—1924) were imams and akhoonds in the city of Petropavlovsk and trustees of the mosque of the Irbit Fair. The family remained in Russia after the revolution and maintained its role as religious leaders in Petropavlovsk during the first years of the Soviet regime.

Descendants

 The Soviet journalist Farid Seiful-Mulyukov was the grandson of the last head of the Yaushev merchant family, Mullagali Yaushev.
 Fatykha Aitova (née Yausheva), the daughter of Abdulvali Yaushev, was the founder of the first women's gymnasium in Kazan in 1916.
 Mukhamedzhan Seralin, Kazakh journalist, founder of the first magazine in Kazakh language, Ay Qap, was a descendand of the Yaushev merchant family from his mother's side. The magazine was initially also sponsored by the Yaushev family.

Sources
 Чайчиц А. Купцы Яушевы. Семейная история. Казань: Татарское книжное издательство, 2020 [Čaičics, A. The Yaushev Merchants: a Family History. Kazan: Tatar Book Publishers, 2020].

References

Tatar dukes and mirzas
Russian noble families
19th-century businesspeople from the Russian Empire
Businesspeople from the Russian Empire
Russian merchants
Russian business families
Tatar muftis
Tatar diaspora
White Russian emigrants to Japan
White Russian emigrants to China